"Charly" is the debut single released by the British electronic act the Prodigy, later included on their debut album, Experience (1992), although the version featured on the album is the significantly different "Trip into Drum & Bass" remix.

It was released in the UK on 12 August 1991 through XL Recordings on vinyl, CD and cassette tape format. Almost a year later, it was released as a double A-side single with "Everybody in the Place" in the United States on 18 June 1992 through Elektra Records on CD, digipak and maxi-single format.

On 22 November 2004 the single was released on digital download format. On 1 October 1992, "Charly" had sold over 200,000 copies in the UK which in turn enabled it a Silver BPI certification. The Alley Cat Mix of "Charly" features as track number three on the expanded disc two of the band's debut album Experience. "Charly" appears on the band's compilation album Their Law: The Singles 1990–2005 as track number nine.

Background
"Charly" was written and produced by band frontman Liam Howlett, together with Chaz Stevens as an additional producer. The single's cover art was designed by Jay McKendry Jenkins. The song samples the 1970s BBC Public Information Film, Charley Says, (from "Double Deckers" of ITV's "Say No to Strangers" campaign), in which a small child is shown with his cat. This sample later resulted in the band being unsuccessfully sued for plagiarism. 

The band was criticised by the dance music magazine Mixmag for inspiring a glut of copycat rave songs which also sampled children's programming, including "Sesame's Treet" by Smart E's and "A Trip To Trumpton" by Urban Hype.

Reception
The song received generally mixed reviews from critics, despite its popularity. Dooyoo.co.uk described "Charly" as "An infamous song which was played at very loud volumes for weeks and its music video turned it into one of the controversial songs of its time." Popmatters.com described "Charly" as an electronic track developed in such a way that it would ensure boredom avoidance. Stylusmagazine.com interpreted the song as "All teenage rampage and suckingly vacant insurgency". Regardless of "Charly"'s mixed critical reception, the track has still genuinely managed to garner a rather widespread cult following over the years for its innovative use of sound, as it has been considered by many fans to be one of the main turning points in electronic music history, if not the overall rave scene in general.

Alexis Petridis, writing for The Guardian in 2020, listed "Charly" at number 16 in his list of his 25 best early '90s breakbeat hardcore tracks.

Music video
A music video directed by Russell Curtis features live footage of one of the costume-wearing Prodigy's early performances with other visual effects. The video contrasts the song's lyrics and "infamous" sample by playing a clip of a government warning to always tell your parents where you were going. The cartoon figure used was a young child, named Tony, who had a ginger cat named Charley; "Charley Says" was a short series of informational cartoons produced for children during the 1970s dealing with everyday issues such as not playing with matches and not talking to strangers.

Track listings
 UK 12-inch single
A1. "Charly" (Alley Cat mix) – 5:24
A2. "Pandemonium" (original mix) – 4:25
B1. "Your Love" (original mix) – 6:00
B2. "Charly" (original mix) – 3:56

 UK digital download (2004)
 "Charly" (original mix) – 3:56
 "Pandemonium" – 4:25
 "Your Love" – 6:00
 "Charly" (Alley Cat mix) – 5:27

Chart performance
On 24 August 1991, "Charly" debuted at number nine on the UK Singles Chart, two weeks later it rose to a peak position of number three where it stayed for two consecutive weeks. The single re-entered the chart almost five years after release at number sixty-six on 20 April 1996. The single re-entered again, a further eight years on from its previous re-entry due to a digital download release of the single. This time at number 73 on 4 December 2004. Altogether it spent a total of six weeks within the top ten and twelve weeks within the top seventy-five.

Weekly charts

Year-end charts

Certifications

External links
 Charly video on Youtube

References

1991 debut singles
1991 songs
The Prodigy songs
XL Recordings singles
Elektra Records singles
Music Week number-one dance singles
Songs written by Liam Howlett
Songs based on children's songs
Songs about television
Songs about fictional male characters
Songs about cats
Songs based on speech samples